Nebria paradisi is a species of ground beetle in the Nebriinae subfamily that can be found in the northern part US state of Oregon. On July 20, 1927, 3 species were discovered in Paradise Valley, Wisconsin. According to A. Smetana, the species are widespread throughout the United States. This species was formerly called Nebria vandykei.

References

paradisi
Beetles described in 1931
Endemic fauna of the United States
Beetles of North America